Peter or Pete Mitchell may refer to:

Media
Pete Mitchell (broadcaster) (1958–2020), British broadcaster
Peter Mitchell (newsreader) (born 1960), Australian journalist
Peter Mitchell (photographer) (born 1943), British documentary photographer

Sports
Pete Mitchell (American football) (born 1971), American football player
Peter Mitchell (cyclist) (born 1990), British racing cyclist
Peter Mitchell (golfer) (born 1958), English golfer
Peter Mitchell-Thomson, 2nd Baron Selsdon (1913–1963), British peer and racing driver

Others
Peter Mitchell (politician) (1824–1899), Canadian politician
Peter Chalmers Mitchell (1864–1945), British zoologist
Peter D. Mitchell (1920–1992), British biochemist

Fictional characters
 Peter Mitchell (Three Men and a Baby), from the film Three Men and a Baby and its sequel
 Pete Mitchell (Top Gun), nickname "Maverick", from the films Top Gun and Top Gun: Maverick